Transverse ligament of scapula may refer to:

 Inferior transverse ligament of scapula
 Superior transverse scapular ligament